Dainard Paulson (born May 5, 1937) is a former collegiate and professional American football player. He played collegiately for Oregon State University and professionally for the American Football League's New York Titans / Jets, where he was an AFL All-Star in 1964 and 1965.

Currently resides in Selah, WA.

See also
Other American Football League players

1937 births
Living people
Players of American football from Los Angeles
American football defensive backs
Oregon State Beavers football players
New York Titans (AFL) players
New York Jets players
American Football League All-Star players
American Football League players